Speed skating at the 1988 Winter Olympics, was held from 14 to 28 February. Ten events were contested at Olympic Oval. For the first time, the women contested a 5000-metre race, the longest distance contested by women in speed skating.

Medal summary

Medal table

East Germany topped the medal table with three gold medals, and thirteen total. Until the 2014 Winter Olympics, the thirteen medals were the most won by any country in speed skating in a single Games. The Dutch passed that total with 23.

The Netherlands' Yvonne van Gennip led the individual medal table with three golds, while Sweden's Tomas Gustafson was the most successful  male skater, with two gold medals.

Men's events

Women's events

Records
The Calgary Olympic Oval was one of the fastest rinks in the world when it opened, with six new world records set, and all existing Olympic records bettered.

Participating NOCs
Twenty-one nations competed in the speed skating events at Calgary.

References

 
1988 Winter Olympics events
1988
1988 in speed skating
Olympics, 1988